A young Italian anarchist, Sante Geronimo Caserio, assassinated the French President Sadi Carnot, on June 24, 1894, in Lyon. Acting in retaliation for the execution of Ravachol and the subsequent ratification of the anti-anarchist lois scélérates ("villainous laws"), Caserio stabbed Sadi Carnot in his open carriage. The president died within hours.

References

Further reading

External links 

 

Anarchism in France
Carnot, Sadi
Crime in Lyon
Carnot, Sadi
June 1894 events
Carnot, Sadi
Carnot, Sadi